Sahid Gate or Shahid Gate (lit. Martyr's Gate) is a monument in Kathmandu, Nepal. The monument was inaugurated on 13 April 1961.  As of 2016, there are five statues in the gate. Four men, namely Dharma Bhakta Mathema, Gangalal Shrestha, Dashrath Chand, and Shukraraj Shastri, who are considered martyrs since they stood against the 104-year-old Rana Regime, have their statues above their arms established here. On top of all is a statue of former King Tribhuvan, who, in B.S. 2007 (A.D. 1950) cooperated with people to get democracy in the country.  The gate was designed by Shankar Nath Rimal. King Mahendra inaugurated the monument and named it Nepal Smarak. However, people started calling it Shahid gate, a name by which it is presently called.

In 2012 a Nepali cabinet meeting decided to move the statue of Tribhuvan from the Gate and to the Narayanhiti Museum and leave the statues of the martyrs only.

See also

 Martyrs of Nepal
 Rana dynasty

References 

Buildings and structures in Kathmandu
Monuments and memorials in Nepal
Tourist attractions in Kathmandu
Gates
 
ne:शहिद गेट